Valeriy Borysovych Babenko (Ukrainian: Валерій Борисович Бабенко; born in 2 February 1964), is a Ukrainian politician and former People's Deputy of Ukraine.

Biography 
Valery Babenko was born on February 2, 1964

In 2005-2006l, was working as assistant to the Head of Security Service of Ukraine.

In the 2006 Ukrainian parliamentary election Babenko failed to get reelected to parliament as a candidate of Yulia Tymoshenko Bloc (placed №181 on its election list).

In 2007 - assistant to the First deputy Secretary of the National Security and Defense Council of Ukraine. 
In November 2007 Valery Babenko was elected the People's Deputy of Ukraine from Yulia Tymoshenko Bloc, №144 on the list. Activities during plenary:
 Member of the Group of Interparliamentary Relations with Poland
 Member of the Group of Interparliamentary Relations with the Republic of Tunisia
 Member of the Group of Interparliamentary Relations with the Republic of Bulgaria
 Member of the Group of Interparliamentary Relations with the Federal Republic of Germany

In the 2012 Ukrainian parliamentary election Babenko failed to get reelected to parliament as a candidate of All-Ukrainian Union "Fatherland" (placed №98 on its election list).

In the 2014 Ukrainian parliamentary election Babenko was re-elected into parliament placed 35th on the electoral list of People's Front.

Babenko did not take part in the 2019 Ukrainian parliamentary election.

See also 
 2007 Ukrainian parliamentary election
 List of Ukrainian Parliament Members 2007
 Verkhovna Rada

External links 
  Valery Babenko at Verkhovna Rada of Ukraine official web-site

References 

1964 births
Living people
Sixth convocation members of the Verkhovna Rada
Eighth convocation members of the Verkhovna Rada
People's Front (Ukraine) politicians
All-Ukrainian Union "Fatherland" politicians